The Legislative Assembly of Rio de Janeiro ( or ALERJ) is the unicameral legislature of Rio de Janeiro, a state in Brazil. It has 70 state deputies elected by proportional representation.

After the 1834 Additional Act, the Provincial Assembly was founded in the city of Vila Real de Praia Grande (now Niterói), after the unification of the states of Guanabara and Rio de Janeiro on March 15, 1975 the assembly was moved to the Tiradentes Palace in the city of Rio de Janeiro (site of the Chamber of Deputies of Brazil until 1960).

External links
Official website
TV Alerj

 
Rio de Janeiro
Rio de Janeiro